The Camerino Farnese is a Fresco cycle (a series of frescos done about a particular subject) that emerged from the decision to paint the ceiling of the Camerino in Rome, before the summer of 1595. The Camerino is on the first, or principal, floor of the Palazzo Farnese, and measures slightly more than fifteen by thirty feet.

Instead of proceeding with the original plans for the Alessandro Farnese cycle, the Farnese Gallery frescoes glorifying their father's deeds would have to wait until the arrival of the book of drawings which Odoardo Fialetti had asked Cardinal Ranuccio Farnese to send him; in the meantime Annibale Carracci was to be given as his first task, the decoration of the cardinal's own study.

Frescoes of Camerino Farnese
 Hercules bearing the globe
 Hercules resting
 Ulysses and Circe
 Ulysses and the Sirens
 Chastity
 Intelligence
 Security
 Piety
 Perseus and Medusa
 Catanian Brothers
 Justice
 Temperance
 Fortitude
 Prudence

Gallery

Further reading

Mythological paintings by Annibale Carracci
Fresco paintings in Rome